The Moderns is a 1988 film by Alan Rudolph, which takes place in 1926 Paris during the period of the Lost Generation and at the height of modernist literature. The film stars Keith Carradine, Linda Fiorentino, John Lone, and Geneviève Bujold among others.

Plot
Nick Hart (Keith Carradine) is an expatriate American artist living in Paris among some of the noted artists and writers of the time, including Ernest Hemingway (Kevin J. O'Connor),  Gertrude Stein (Elsa Raven), and Alice B. Toklas (Ali Giron). Nick is torn between his ex-wife Rachel (Linda Fiorentino) and Nathalie de Ville (Geraldine Chaplin), who hires him to forge her paintings. He must also contend with Rachel's current husband, Bertram Stone (John Lone), who does not know that his wife is still married to another man.

Cast
Keith Carradine as Nick Hart
Linda Fiorentino as Rachel Stone
John Lone as Bertram Stone
Wallace Shawn as Oiseau
Geneviève Bujold as Libby Valentin
Geraldine Chaplin as Nathalie de Ville
Kevin J. O'Connor as Ernest Hemingway

Production
Meg Tilly was set to play the part of Rachel Stone, but withdrew due to scheduling conflicts.  Linda Fiorentino eventually signed on to replace her. Mick Jagger and Sam Shepard were considered to play Bertram Stone, before John Lone was cast. Isabella Rossellini screen-tested for the role of Nathalie de Ville, but lost to Geraldine Chaplin.

The film was originally planned to be shot in 1977, and it was set to be produced by Alive Enterprises, but the film was stuck in development hell, and it was not properly filmed until 1987.

Reception
The film received fairly positive reviews from critics, and it holds an 81% rating on Rotten Tomatoes based on 21 reviews. It was nominated for three Independent Spirit Awards, including Best Supporting Male for John Lone, Best Screenplay, and Best Cinematography.

American film critic, Roger Ebert, in his review stated that The Moderns is:
"sort of a source study for the Paris of Ernest Hemingway in the 1920s; it's a movie about the raw material he shaped into The Sun Also Rises and A Moveable Feast, and it also includes raw material for books by Gertrude Stein, Malcolm Cowley and Clifford Irving."

Notes

External links

1988 films
1988 drama films
1980s English-language films
Films about fictional painters
Films directed by Alan Rudolph
Films set in 1926
Films set in Paris
Films set in the Roaring Twenties
Films shot in Montreal
American independent films
American drama films
Films scored by Mark Isham
1988 independent films
1980s American films